Shurak-e Maleki (also Romanized as Shūrak-e Malekī and Shūrak Malekī; also known as Shorak) is a village in Pain Velayat Rural District, Razaviyeh District, Mashhad County, Razavi Khorasan Province, Iran.

Population
At the 2006 census, its population was 955, in 219 families.

References 

Populated places in Mashhad County